The Alhandra heart-tongued frog (Phyllodytes brevirostris)  is a species of frog in the family Hylidae endemic to Brazil.

Habitat
Its natural habitats are subtropical or tropical moist lowland forests and subtropical or tropical moist shrubland.
The frogs are threatened by habitat loss.

References

Sources

Phyllodytes
Endemic fauna of Brazil
Amphibians described in 1988
Taxonomy articles created by Polbot